Don Askarian (born Makedon Hovsepi Askarian on 10 July 1949 in Stepanakert, Nagorno-Karabakh Autonomous Oblast, USSR – died 6 October 2018 in Berlin, Germany) was an international film director, producer, photographer and screenwriter of Armenian origin.

Biography
Don Askarian was born in Stepanakert in the Nagorno-Karabakh Autonomous Oblast (current-day de facto Republic of Artsakh, de jure Azerbaijan). In 1967 he moved to Moscow and studied history and art, and worked as an assistant director and film critic for a year after his graduation. Askarian was imprisoned during 1975–1977, and in 1978 he emigrated from the Soviet Union to West Berlin. He lived and worked in Germany, The Netherlands and in Armenia, where he founded his own film companies. He was awarded numerous prizes at several international film festivals.

His films were co-produced and broadcast by ARD, WDR, ZDF, Channel 4, Arte, as well as Belgian, Greek, Swiss, Slovakian, Armenian TV Channels.

In 1996, Askarian published a book called The Dangerous Light. In 2002 he was honored with a Harvard Film Archive retrospective and two years later, in 2004, received the Golden Camera Award for Life Achievement at Int. ART Film Festival, Slovakia. Askarian's brother is sculptor and painter Robert Askarian.

Filmography
Sources:

 1984: The Bear
 1988: Nagorno Karabakh: Armenian History Volumes IV and V (Լեռնային Ղարաբաղ)
 1988: Komitas (Կոմիտաս)
 1992: Avetik (Ավետիք)
 1998: Paradjanov (Փարաջանով)
 2000: Musicians (Երաժիշտները)
 2001: On the Old Roman Road (Հին հռոմեական ճանապարհին)
 2007: Ararat: 14 Views (Արարատ. 14 տեսանկյուն)
 2008: Father (Հայրիկ)

References

 The Harvard Film Archiv

1949 births
2018 deaths
Armenian film critics
People from Stepanakert
Soviet prisoners and detainees
Prisoners and detainees of the Soviet Union
Soviet emigrants to Germany